Minuscule 179 (in the Gregory-Aland numbering), ε 211 (Soden), is a Greek minuscule manuscript of the New Testament, on parchment. Palaeographically it has been assigned to the 12th century. It has marginalia.

Description 

The codex contains an almost complete text of the four Gospels on 249 thick parchment leaves (size ), with some lacunae. The text is written in one column per page, in 21-23 lines per page, in dark-brown ink; the capital letters in red.

The last five leaves (214-218) and two others (23, 30) are paper, and were added later in the 15th or 16th century.

There is also a division according to the Ammonian Sections, with references to the Eusebian Canons (written below Ammonian Section numbers).

Synaxarion and Menologion were added in the 15th or 16th century on paper.

Text 
The Greek text of the manuscript is mostly the Byzantine, but it is not pure Byzantine. Kurt Aland did not place it in any Category. It is classified to the textual Family 1424.
According to the Claremont Profile Method it represents textual family Kx in Luke 10 and Luke 20. In Luke 1 it has mixed text.

History 

It was examined by Bianchini, Birch (about 1782), and Scholz. C. R. Gregory saw it in 1886.

It is currently housed at the Biblioteca Angelica (11), at Rome.

See also 

 List of New Testament minuscules
 Biblical manuscript
 Textual criticism

References

Further reading

External links 
 Minuscule 179 at the Encyclopedia of Textual Criticism

Greek New Testament minuscules
12th-century biblical manuscripts